Pleasant Grove is an unincorporated community in Maury County, in the U.S. state of Tennessee.

History
A post office called Pleasant Grove was established in 1827, and remained in operation until 1860. A variant name was "Pleasant Grove Depot". Besides the train depot, Pleasant Grove contained several commercial buildings including a gristmill.

References

Unincorporated communities in Maury County, Tennessee
Unincorporated communities in Tennessee